Heterocrossa iophaea is a species of moth in the family Carposinidae. It is endemic to New Zealand.

Taxonomy 
This species was described by Edward Meyrick in 1907 using material collected by Alfred Philpott in Invercargill. In 1922 Meyrick classified Heterocrossa as a synonym of the genus Carposina. George Hudson discussed and illustrated this species under the name Carposina iophaea in his 1928 publication The Butterflies and Moths of New Zealand. In 1978 Elwood Zimmerman argued that the genus Heterocrassa  should not be a synonym of Carposina as the genitalia of the species within the genus Heterocrassa are distinctive. In 1988 John S. Dugdale assigned the species back to the genus Heterocrossa. He also synonymised Heterocrossa thalamota with Heterocrossa iophaea. The lectotype specimen is held at the Natural History Museum, London.

Description 

This species was described by Meyrick as follows:

Distribution 
This species is endemic to New Zealand. As well as the type locality of Invercargill, this species has also occurred in Wyndham, in the Peel Forest in Canterbury, Waiho Gorge in Westland, and Puhi Puhi in Marlborough. Specimens have also been collected in the North Island in locations such as at Whakapapa, Whangarei, Hawkes Bay, Waimarino in the Bay of Plenty region and Price's Bush in the Tararua Range.

Biology and behaviour 
This species is on the wing between October and February. The adult moths rest on the trunks of trees or alternatively hide among the twigs and leaves on the ground. The manner in which the adult moth folds its wings assists it in finding hiding places. The adult moths are attracted to light. They have also been collected through the beating of bush.

Habitat and host species 

This species is found in native forest habitat. The larvae feed on the immature seeds of the mataī tree, Prumnopitys taxifolia. As the seeds mature the larvae switch to eating the sugar-rich outer wall tissues of the seed before pupating.

References

External links

Image of lectotype specimen

Carposinidae
Moths of New Zealand
Moths described in 1907
Endemic fauna of New Zealand
Taxa named by Edward Meyrick
Endemic moths of New Zealand